Thaumatophyllum adamantinum is a plant in the genus Thaumatophyllum, in the family Araceae. It is native to South America, namely to Southeast Brazil, but is also cultivated as a houseplant in cooler climates.

Previously Thaumatophyllum adamantinum was called Philodendron adamantinum, until DNA sequencing determined it to belong to a different genus.

Growth 

It grows in the seasonally dry tropical biome.

The stems grow both decumbent or erect and are both green and glossy. The leaves are glossy green, oval in shape, and have 3-5 laterally divided lobes. Leaves are widest as the midpoint, shorter both at the apex and at the base. While green, some leaves may be slightly pinkish near the petiole.

Reproduction 
Thaumatophyllum adamantinum reproduces sexually through flowers and stamens. Flowers are inflorescent with a 2–5 cm peduncle, 6.4-11.4 cm single leaf surrounding the stamen (called a spathe), and a 5.5 cm-12.5 cm spadix. The spathe is green with a creamy white inner surface. Flowers have 5 staminodes and cylindrical petals. Berries are oblong and generate 2.5mm long oblong seeds containing oily droplets. 

Thaumatophyllum adamantinum can be propagated by taking cuttings. With a sterilized sharp knife, cut off a section with multiple aerial roots and leaves at a sharp angle. The cutting can then be rooted in water, soil, or in sphagnum moss.

Toxicology 
Like their relative Philodendron, Thaumatophyllum are poisonous to vertebrates, but vary in their toxicity levels. They contain calcium oxalate crystals in raphide bundles, which are poisonous and irritating. The sap may cause skin irritation. Chewing and/or ingesting parts of the plant may result in severe swelling and compromised respiratory functions.

References 

Epiphytes
Garden plants
House plants
adamantinum
Flora of Brazil